Estonioceras is an extinct genus of tarphyceridan nautiloids from the Ordovician of Europe.

Sources

 Dinosaur Encyclopedia by Jayne Parsons  
 Fossils (Smithsonian Handbooks) by David Ward

External links
Estonioceras in the Paleobiology Database

Prehistoric nautiloid genera
Ordovician cephalopods of Europe
Fossil taxa described in 1883